723 Squadron  is a Royal Australian Navy Fleet Air Arm squadron. The squadron was first raised in 1952 and throughout its history has served operationally during the Vietnam War, the Gulf War and in East Timor. It currently operates as a helicopter training squadron and is based at HMAS Albatross at Nowra, New South Wales.

History
The Royal Navy's original 723 Naval Air Squadron arrived at Nowra in January 1945 after travelling from the United Kingdom on the troopship Athlone Castle. The squadron "towed drogue targets [and provided] ‘attacking aircraft’ for ship and aircraft gunnery practice, radar calibration and radar interception targets." It was disbanded on May 31, 1946.

723 Squadron was first commissioned into the Royal Australian Navy (RAN) on 7 April 1952 and was equipped with one Dakota, one Wirraway, one Sea Otter and two Sea Fury aircraft. 

On 11 March 1953 the Squadron took delivery of the RAN's first helicopter, a Bristol Sycamore. 723 Squadron also took delivery of the RAN's first jet aircraft, a de Havilland Vampire Mk T.34 on 18 June 1954. 

During the Vietnam War, personnel from the squadron operated as part of the Experimental Military Unit, a joint Australian-American helicopter assault and transport unit.
During the squadron's history, the battle honours "Vietnam 1967–71", "Kuwait 1991", and "East Timor 1999" have been earned.

Current roles
723 Squadron was previously equipped with 13 Aerospatiale AS 350BA Ecureuil (Squirrel) and three Bell 429 helicopters. The Squadron is based at HMAS Albatross (NAS Nowra). The Squirrels were used for conversion training all pilots, observers and aircrew from fixed wing to rotary wing aircraft. The Bell 429 joined the Squadron in 2012 on lease from Raytheon Australia and were used for multi engine training for pilots moving onto other aircraft such as the S-70B-2 Seahawk. 

It is currently active as the Australian Defence Force's helicopter training squadron operating the EC-135T2+ helicopter at the Joint Helicopter School.

Aircraft

Current
EC-135T2+ - training  and personnel transport.

Previous
Supermarine Sea Otter
de Havilland Tiger Moth
Auster Autocar
CAC Wirraway
Bristol Sycamore
Hawker Sea Fury
Fairey Firefly
Westland Scout
de Havilland Sea Venom
de Havilland Vampire
Douglas C-47 Dakota
Bell UH-1
Bell/CAC 206B-1 Kiowa
Westland Wessex
Hawker Siddeley HS 748
Agusta A109E
Aerospatiale AS 350BA Ecureuil (Squirrel)
Bell 429

References

External links
 RAN webpage on 723 Squadron's history
 Fleet Air Arm Association of Australia webpage on 723 Squadron

Flying squadrons of the Royal Australian Navy
Helicopter units and formations
Military units and formations established in 1952
1952 establishments in Australia